The Scholastic Picture Book Award (SPBA) is an award developed by Scholastic Asia and the Singapore Book Council.

Winners

2015 
 Grand Prize: The First Journey, by Phung Nguyen Quang (writer) and Huynh Kim Lien (illustrator) (Vietnam)
 2nd: Pandu, the Ogoh-Ogoh Maker, by Ari Nilandari (writer) and Dewi Tri K. (illustrator) (Indonesia)
 3rd: Purchased Dream, by Ganbaatar Ichinnorov (writer) and Bolormaa Baasansuren (illustrator) (Mongolia)

See also 

 Scholastic Asian Book Award

References

External links 
 Official website

Picture book awards
Children's literary awards
Asian literary awards